Abdelbasset Hannachi (born February 2, 1985) is an Algerian former professional cyclist.

Major results

2003
 1st  Road race, Arab Road Championships
2006
 1st  Road race, Arab Road Championships
2007
 1st Stage 5 Tour des Aéroports
2008
 1st International Grand Prix Losail
 2nd International Grand Prix Messaeed
 4th International Grand Prix Al-Khor
 6th Overall Cycling Golden Jersey
 9th Time trial, African Road Championships
2009
 1st  Road race, Arab Road Championships
 1st Stage 2 International Presidency Tour
 1st Stage 3 Tour de East Java
 1st Stage 1 Tour des Aéroports
 2nd H. H. Vice-President's Cup
 2nd Emirates Cup
2010
 Challenge du Prince
2nd Trophée Princier
10th Trophée de l'Anniversaire
 2nd Challenge Spécial Ramadan
 2nd Grand Prix of Al Fatah
 9th Overall Tour of Libya
1st Stages 1 & 2
 10th Vice President Cup
2011
 3rd  Team time trial, All-Africa Games
 4th Road race, African Road Championships
2012
 1st Stage 2 Tour of Oran
 3rd Challenge Youssoufia, Challenge des phosphates
 10th Jūrmala Grand Prix
2013
 1st Stage 1 Tour de Chlef
 1st Stage 2 Fenkil Northern Red Sea Challenge
 1st Stage 3 Tour of Eritrea
 1st Stage 3 Tour d'Algérie
 1st Stage 2 Tour de Tipaza
 3rd  Road race, Mediterranean Games
 6th Overall Sharjah International Cycling Tour
1st Points classification
1st Mountains classification
 10th Overall Tour du Faso
1st Points classification
1st Stages 5 & 10
 10th Circuit d'Alger
2014
 1st  Road race, National Road Championships
 1st Stage 6 Tour du Maroc
2015
 1st Overall Tour d'Annaba
1st Stages 2 & 3
 1st Critérium International de Blida
 2nd Critérium International de Sétif
2016
 3rd Critérium International de Sétif
 6th GP de la Ville d'Oran
 8th Critérium International d'Alger

References

External links

1985 births
Living people
Algerian male cyclists
Mediterranean Games bronze medalists for Algeria
Mediterranean Games medalists in cycling
Competitors at the 2013 Mediterranean Games
African Games bronze medalists for Algeria
African Games medalists in cycling
Competitors at the 2011 All-Africa Games
21st-century Algerian people